Zhuma Township is a rural township in Wucheng District of Jinhua, eastern China's Zhejiang province.  it had a population of 11,000 and an area of . It is surrounded by Lanxi city on the northwest, Luodian Town on the east, and Qianxi Township on the south. It is hailed as the hometown of Camellia.

Transportation
Zhumaguan railway station serves the town.  

Jinhua-Qiandaohu railway passes across the township.

Hangzhou-Jinhua-Quzhou Expressway runs through the township.

The Second Ring Road travels through the township.

References

Divisions of Wucheng District
Townships of Jinhua